Kriemhild (minor planet designation: 242 Kriemhild) is a main belt asteroid that was discovered by Austrian astronomer Johann Palisa on 22 September 1884 in Vienna and was named after Kriemhild, a mythological Germanic princess, by Moriz von Kuffner, a Viennese industrialist and sponsor of astronomy.

Photometric observations of this asteroid at the Oakley Observatory in Terre Haute, Indiana, during 2006 gave a light curve with a period of 4.558 ± 0.003 hours and a brightness variation of 0.15 ± 0.02 in magnitude.

References

External links
 Lightcurve plot of 242 Kriemhild, Palmer Divide Observatory, B. D. Warner (2004)
 Asteroid Lightcurve Database (LCDB), query form (info )
 Dictionary of Minor Planet Names, Google books
 Asteroids and comets rotation curves, CdR – Observatoire de Genève, Raoul Behrend
 Discovery Circumstances: Numbered Minor Planets (1)-(5000) – Minor Planet Center
 
 

Background asteroids
Kriemhild
Kriemhild
Xc-type asteroids (SMASS)
18840922